The 22937/22938 Rajkot–Rewa Superfast Express is a Superfast train belonging to Western Railway zone that runs between  and  in India. It is currently being operated with 22937/22938 train numbers on a weekly basis.

Coach composition

The train has standard ICF rakes with max speed of 110 kmph. The train consists of 23 coaches:

 1 AC II Tier
 5 AC III Tier
 11 Sleeper coaches
 4 General Unreserved
 2 Seating cum Luggage Rake

Service

The 22937/Rajkot–Rewa Superfast Express has an average speed of 58 km/hr and covers 1601 km in 27 hrs 30 mins.

The 22938/Rewa–Rajkot Superfast Express has an average speed of 62 km/hr and covers 1601 km in 25 hrs 45 mins.

Route and halts 

The important halts of the train are:

Schedule

Traction

Both trains are hauled by a Vatva Loco Shed-based WDM-3A diesel locomotive from Rajkot to Ahmedabad. From Ahmedabad, trains are hauled by a Vadodara Loco Shed-based WAP-4E electric locomotive uptil Itarsi. From Itarsi trains are hauled by an Itarsi Loco Shed-based WDM-3A diesel locomotive uptil Rewa and vice versa.

Rake sharing

The train shares its rake with 20913/20914 Rajkot–Delhi Sarai Rohilla Weekly Superfast Express.

See also 

 Rewa Terminal railway station
 Rajkot Junction railway station
 Rajkot–Delhi Sarai Rohilla Weekly Superfast Express

Notes

References

External links 

 22937/Rajkot–Rewa Superfast Express India Rail Info
 22938/Rewa–Rajkot Superfast Express India Rail Info

Transport in Rajkot
Transport in Rewa, Madhya Pradesh
Express trains in India
Rail transport in Maharashtra
Rail transport in Rajasthan
Rail transport in Gujarat
Railway services introduced in 2015